The Aranmula Boat Race the oldest river boat festival in Kerala, the south western State of India is held during Onam (August–September). It takes place at Aranmula, near Sri Parthasarady Temple dedicated to Lord Krishna and Arjuna in Pathanamthitta district of Kerala State. The snake boats move in pairs to the rhythm of full-throated singing and shouting watched by an exciting crowd. In 1972, snake boat races were also added to the program of the festival. Thousands of people gather on the banks of the river Pampa to watch the snake boat races. In 2019 Fifty Two snake boats or Palliyodams had participated in the festival. The oarsmen sing traditional boat songs Vanchippattu and wear white mundu and turbans. The golden lace at the head of the boat, the flag and the ornamental umbrella at the center make it a show of pageantry too.

Aranmula temple
Aranmula is about 128 km from Trivandrum, capital city of Kerala. It is situated on the banks of the river Pampa in Pathanamthitta district of Kerala. The famous temple at Aranmula is dedicated to Sree Parthasarathy of Lord Krishna as the divine charioteer of Arjuna. A rough estimate puts the age of this temple to 1700 years.

Palliyodams (snake boats)

Palliyodams are Aranmula’s unique snake boats (Chundan Vallam) which devotees hold in reverence, considering it as the divine vessel of the presiding deity in Sree Parthasarathy temple. These Palliyodams belong to different Karas (rustic parts) on the banks of river Pampa. Each one will usually have 4 helmsmen, rowers and singers. It is decorated with golden lace.  There will be a flag and two or three ornamental umbrellas.

Construction
Locating a suitable tree preferably Anjili, cutting it down and bringing to the location for construction is the first step. Selecting an auspicious day and time work begins. All these are according to Vedas, an ancient treatise on building of wooden boats. These boats are about 100 to 138 ft in length, with the rear portion towering to a height of about 20 ft. and a long tapering front portion. When completed it resembles a snake with its hood raised. Its hull is built of planks precisely 83 feet in length and six inches wide.

Care of a snake boat
Every year the boats are oiled mainly with fish oil, coconut shell, and carbon to keep the wood strong and the boat slippery in the water. The village carpenter carries out annual repairs and people take pride in their boat, which is named after and represents their village.

Getting onto a snake boat
Only men of the village are allowed to be in the boat.
Dress. White loin cloth (Mundu) and turban.
No shirt and footwear.

Traditionally it will be commanded by a Kaarnavan / Karanaadhan (Village leader) with First Adanayampu and under him there will be three main oarsmen who control the movement of the boat with 12 feet long main rudder-oar (Adanayampu). Sitting two in row along the length of the Boat  there will be the oarsmen, They row in rhythm of the Vanchippattu (boatman's song).  Standing on the platform in the middle of the boat, the main singer will lead the Vanchippattu. A few singers will be with the main leader while others will stand at the middle between the oarsmen.

Vanchipattu
The singers lead the Vanchippattu (boatman's song) which the oarsmen will repeat and they move the oars in circular form according to its rhythm. Usually the selection will be from "Kuchela Vrythom Vanchipattu".

Example: (in Malayalam)
Note that The oar should make one full circle between the dashes (-).
Singers – Paranja-thangane thanney-
Oarsmen - Thei thei -thakathei thei thom- 
Singers – Paranja-thangane thanney-
Oarsmen – Thithi tha thi-  thei thei,   
Singers – Paranja-thangane thanney – paathirava-yallo Pathni
Oarsmen – Paranja-thangane thanney – paathirava-yallo Pathni
All together – Ohh thei tha- thaka tha thiki thaka thom
                Theeya Thitho thitho thikithom
Singers - Kuranj-onnurangatte njan 
Oarsmen - Thei thei -thakathei thei thoy-
Singers - Kuranj-onnurangatte njan 
Oarsmen – Thitha tha thi-  thei thei,
Singers - Kuranj-onnurangatte njan ulak -irezhum

Festivals
A number of colourful festivals rich in traditions are held at Aranmula temple every year. The most important festival is the traditional palliyodam regatta (boat festival). Three important events take place in which the Palliyodams participate. All these are solemn religious custom and there were no competitive races.

Thiruvonam
On Thiruvonam day people of Kerala celebrate it with a feast. Aranmula celebrations begin with the arrival of Thiruvonathoni (special boats) from Kattoor. For a sumptuous meal for the Lord at Aranmula, a boat with the necessary provisions, and an ever-burning lamp, set off its journey from the temple at Kattoor at 6 pm so that it could reach Aranmula temple by 4 am the next day, the Thiruonam day. At 6 pm long main rudder-oar (Adanayampu) will be presented to the temple at Kattoor and then it will be handed over to the leading oarsman. Mr. Bhattathiri of Mangaatt Illam with 18 men will get into the boat and it will begin its journey to Aranmula. The boat is expected to float according to the speed of the current. The sound of the nagaswaram (musical pipe) could be heard from a distance. People from all walks of life, age and religion will assemble on the river bank and they will float lighted lamps on the river welcoming the Thiruvonathoni. It is believed that the palliyodams were built to protect this Thiruvonathoni. So early morning on Thiruvonam day all these palliyodams will accompany the Thiruvonathoni.

Uthrittathi
It is considered that ‘’Uthrittathi’’ day is the anniversary of the installation of the idol consecrated in the south, by Pandavas. So on that day, there will be a Snake boat regatta in front of the Aranmula temple.

Aranmula Vallasadya

Another important event is the Aranmula Vallasadya (banquet). It is served to the oarsmen of snake boats at the Parthasarthy temple premises and at nearby dining hall and auditorium. it starts in mid July (karkitakam) and will last till September.( kanni month) 254 vallasadyas were held in 2008 besides the mega feast on Ashtami Rohini. For this mega feast as many as 50,000 people from different parts of the state took part. Rice with 68 side dishes were served at the Sadya on banana leaves including the following side dishes. 
Valla sadya is performed with a strict style. First, one who offers the feast has to invite the karanathan. On the day he has to put two 'nirapara's down the 'kodimaram' flag post, with betel, and tobacco and areca nut. Around 11 o'clock the boat people will come in the decorated boat with vallapattu. They are welcomed with thalappoli and these offerings, and are marched with rhythmic slogans first in front to the god and then to the separate hall arranged for the feast. They are treated with whatever they ask, and after the feast they are sent back following up to the river.

Adaprathaman. (Pudding); Aravana payasam. (Pudding made from rice, jaggery and ghee); Aval (flattened rice); Avial (Mixed vegetable curry); Banana chips; Chammanthi powder (Chutney with chillies); Chukku vellum (dried ginger water); Curd; Ellunda (gingelly ball); Fried banana; Ghee; Ginger curry; Holy water from river Pampa; Kaalhen (curry made from curds); Kaalipazham payasam (Pudding made of banana); Kalkandum (Sugar candy); Kadala Prathaman (made of Bengal gram) ; Kychadi (Curry made of rice and gram); Mango curry; Munthiri pachadi (Curry made of grapes); Olen, (mixed curry); Pacchadi (A vegetable curry); Paal payasm (Pudding made of Milk); Pachamoru; Pulisserry (Curry prepared with thick and sour buttermilk); Resam; Red Cheera Thoran (made with a variety of amaranthus); Sambar; Thakara Thoran (Thoran with cassia tora); Unniappam.

Palliyodoms that took part in September 2016

(Maximum number of men allowed in the boat and total length of the snake boats are given in brackets.)
Arattupuzha. (139, .. ) 
Ayroor (125, 143’)	
 Chennithala. (80, 117).
Cherukol Sri Padmanabha Dasa Palliyodom. (110, 99’)
Edanad. (.., 146)
Edappavur. (110, 123)
Edappavur –Peroor (110, 142’) 
Edasserimala. (.., 139).
Edasserimala- East.. (85, 139).
Edayaranmula. (140

Edayaranmula- East. (100, 146’)
Kadapra. (.., ..) 
Keezhvanmazhi (110, 139)
Kattoor (80, 140’)
Keezhukara. (135, 142’). Stern Height 20’, the one having the longest
Kodiattukara. (80, ..)
Koipram (100, 139). 84 years old.
Kottathur.  (60, ..)
Kozhencherry (100, 133’)
Kuriannoor. (100, 139’)
Lhaha. (95, 140’)
Malakkara (110, 143’)
Mallappuzhassery (.., 99’)
Mangalam. (85, ..)
Melukara (.., 142’)
Maramon. (100, 142)  
Mundan Kavu (112, …). One hundred years old.
Muthuvazhi. (65, ..)
Nedumprayar. (.., 142’)  
Nellickal, (.., 137’)
Othara (81, 124’)
Poovathur  East. (77, 124)
Poovathur West (104, 129’)
Prayaar
Punnamthottam (140, 144’)
Ranni. (.., 121’)
Thekkemuri (112, 137’)
Thottapuzhassery. (85, ..) 
Thymaravumkara. (64, 124)
Umayattukara. (110, 120’)
Vanmazhi. (70, 120). 
Venpala (.., 125’)
Aranmula regatta (Vallam Kali) is part of the cultural heritage of Kerala state as a whole and Aranmula in particular.

See also
 Aranmula kottaram
 Chundan Vallam
 Nehru Trophy Boat Race
 Vallam Kali
 Onam
 Cuisine of Kerala
 Aranmula

Other renowned boat races in Kerala
 President's Trophy Boat Race
 Champakulam Moolam Boat Race
 Nehru Trophy Boat Race
 Payippad Jalotsavam
 Kumarakom Boat Race
 Kallada Boat Race
 Pampa Boat Race, Neerettupuram
 Gothuruth Boat Race since 1938, Ernakullam

External links

http://www.aranmula.net
 Snake Boat Race
http://www.aranmulavallamkali.com
Aranmula Vallamkali 2010
Aranmula
A foreigner's experience of Aranmula snake boats - Onam 2011

References

Hindu festivals in Kerala
Boat races in Kerala
Boat festivals
Festivals in Pathanamthitta district
Aranmula
Pamba River